Eudonia lacustrata is a species of moth of the family Crambidae described by Georg Wolfgang Franz Panzer in 1804. It is found in Europe, north-west Africa, Asia from Turkey, Iran and Syria to Siberia and the western part of China (Hunan). The subspecies E. lacustrata persica is found in Iran and Armenia.

The wingspan is 16–18 mm. The forewings are grey whitish, sometimes mixed with light ochreous-yellowish, sprinkled with black. Pale central fascia and black-brown 
antemedial and subterminal cross-lines edged with yellowish white.

The moth flies from May to August depending on the location.

The larvae feed on various mosses.

References

External links
 Waarneming.nl 
 Lepidoptera of Belgium
 Eudonia lacustrata at UKMoths

Eudonia
Moths described in 1804
Moths of Africa
Moths of Asia
Moths of Europe
Taxa named by Georg Wolfgang Franz Panzer